Sardulgarh is a City in Mansa district in the Indian state of Punjab. Surrounded by cities of Mansa city, Sirsa, Tohana, Bathinda, Fatehabad. It is a Sub-Division (Tehsil) of District Mansa. Its old name was Tadalan or Dhudalan/Dhudhal.

Geography
Sardulgarh is located in the south region of Punjab State. The longitude and latitude at 29.697°N 75.238752°E. It has an average elevation of 210 metres (688 feet). It is a city located around the bank of River Ghagar. It is surrounded and touch the border of Haryana State from 3 sides. Its boundary touches to 3 districts (Bathinda, Sirsa and Fatehabad).

Demographics
 India census, Sardulgarh had a population of 16,315. Males constitute 54% of the population and females 46%. Sardulgarh has an average literacy rate of 65%, more than the national average of 59.5%: male literacy is 72%, and female literacy is 61%.

References

Cities and towns in Mansa district, India